The 1996 Air Africa crash occurred on 8 January when an overloaded Zairese Air Africa's Antonov An-32B aircraft, bound for Kahemba Airport, overshot the runway at N'Dolo Airport in Kinshasa, Zaire (now the Democratic Republic of the Congo) after failing to take off and ploughed into Kinshasa's Simbazikita street market. Four of the six crew of the aircraft that had been wet leased from Moscow Airways, managed to survive. However, between 225 and 348 fatalities and around 253 serious injuries occurred on the ground. This crash remains the deadliest in African history, and also one with the most ground fatalities of any air disaster in history, superseded only by the intentional crashes of American Airlines Flight 11 and United Airlines Flight 175 in the September 11 attacks.

Background
After decades of conflicts in sub-Saharan Africa, the air transport business is complex and often illegal. As Johan Peleman explained: 

It has been reported that this flight was carrying weapons to UNITA:

Crash
While attempting to take off fully fuelled and overloaded from N'Dolo Airport's short runway, the An-32B did not achieve sufficient speed to bring its nose up, yet began to lift. It crashed into the open-air Simbazikita produce market, full of shacks, pedestrians and cars, and its full fuel load ignited. The number of casualties cited varies from 225 (per the manslaughter charges) to 348.

Aftermath
The first injured went to the Mama Yemo Hospital (now Kinshasa General Hospital), which was quickly overwhelmed. Two other hospitals took the additional victims. A worker with the International Committee of the Red Cross, Vincent Nicod, stated that 217 bodies were found at the market, in addition to 32 more bodies possibly already at morgues within the city.

President Mobutu and Saolona both attended the funeral on 10 January 1996 at the Protestant Cathédrale du Centenaire.

The Russian pilots, Nicolai Kazarin and Andrei Gouskov, were charged and convicted of manslaughter, each receiving the maximum two-year sentence. At trial, they admitted they were using borrowed clearance papers from Scibe Airlift, that they knew the flight was illegal, and that the flight was actually bound for Angola. Scibe Airlift and African Air paid fines of US$1.4 million to the families and the injured.

The underlying hazards of overloaded aircraft overflying densely populated areas were not addressed in the Democratic Republic of Congo, and on 4 October 2007 a virtual repeat occurred in the 2007 Africa One's Antonov An-26 crash at Ndjili, Kinshasa's other airport.

References

External links

J Rupert, Zaïre reportedly selling arms to Angolan ex-rebels, The Washington Post, 21 March 1997.
Chaos am Himmel ueber Afrika Die Zeit, (May 1996) 
Bolenge Ngbanzo "La place Type-K 'new look': un paradis pour les chasseurs d'immondices" l'Avenir, 9 July 2008 

Crash-Arien (mixed en/fr)
Russian airfax 12 January 1996
Aftermath of the crash from Associated Press Archive

Accidents and incidents involving the Antonov An-32
1996 in Zaire
Aviation accidents and incidents in 1996
Aviation accidents and incidents in the Democratic Republic of the Congo
Airliner accidents and incidents involving runway overruns
Air Africa accidents and incidents
Moscow Airways accidents and incidents
January 1996 events in Africa